Christopher Hinton may refer to:
 Christopher Hinton, Baron Hinton of Bankside (1901–1983), nuclear engineer and supervisor of the construction of Britain's first commercial nuclear power station (Calder Hall)
 Chris Hinton (born 1961), American football player
 Christopher Hinton (animator) (born 1952), Canadian animator
 Christopher Hinton Jr.